Laois County Infirmary was a hospital in Portlaoise, County Laois, Ireland.

History
The infirmary was built by David Henry in 1808. It was replaced by the Midland Regional Hospital, Portlaoise in 1936. The building, which survives, was refurbished and converted to offices in the early 2000s and is now an integral part of Grattan Business Centre.

See also
Midland Regional Hospital, Portlaoise

References

Hospitals in County Laois
1808 establishments in Ireland
Hospitals established in 1808
Defunct hospitals in the Republic of Ireland
1936 disestablishments in Ireland